Jake Higgs (born December 20, 1975 in Regina, Saskatchewan) is a Canadian curler from Strathroy, Ontario. He coached the mixed doubles rink of Matt Hamilton and Becca Hamilton at the 2018 Winter Olympics.

Curling career
Higgs played second for Wayne Tuck, Jr.'s mixed team, that won a provincial championship in 2008–09, giving them the right to represent Ontario at the 2009 Canadian Mixed Curling Championship. The team lost in the final to Sean Grassie's Manitoba rink. Higgs was also a member of the team that won the 2002 provincial mixed championship.

Higgs began skipping a men's team in 2008, which finished fourth place at the 2009 provincial championship. In 2010, his team played in its first Grand Slam event, losing three straight before being eliminated at the 2010 Players' Championships.

Higgs continued to skip his own rink until 2014, when he joined the Robert Rumfeldt rink, throwing lead stones for the team for one season. He went back to skipping in 2015 for two seasons before being chosen to coach USA Curling.

In 2017, he began skipping an Iqaluit-based team and won the 2020 Nunavut Brier Playdowns and represented Nunavut at the 2020 Tim Hortons Brier where they finished with a 0–7 record. Representing Nunavut again at the 2023 Tim Hortons Brier, Higgs defeated Nathan Young's Newfoundland and Labrador team to earn the territory's first ever win at the national men's curling championship.

Personal life
Higgs works as a high school teacher for the Thames Valley District School Board. He is married to Sara Gatchell and has two children.

Grand Slam record

References

External links

Living people
1975 births
Curlers from Ontario
People from Strathroy-Caradoc
Canadian male curlers
Canadian curling coaches
Curlers from Regina, Saskatchewan
Canadian schoolteachers